Pain Dasteh-ye Rakan Kola (also Romanized as Pā’īn Dasteh-ye Rakan Kolā; also known as Āzād Maḩalleh and Pā’īn Dasteh) is a village in Kiakola Rural District, in the Central District of Simorgh County, Mazandaran Province, Iran. At the 2006 census, its population was 436, in 113 families.

References 

Populated places in Simorgh County